The Black River is a river in Hastings County in Central Ontario, Canada. It is part of the Great Lakes Basin, and is a left tributary of the Moira River.

Course
It flows south then southeast, passes into geographic Grimsthorpe Township in the municipality of Tweed, and reaches Lingham Lake. It leaves the lake at the south and flows south into geographic Elzevir Township, where it takes in the right tributary West Black River, arcs briefly west into the municipality of Madoc, then returns east into Elzevir Township near the community of Queensborough. The river there goes over a weir, continues south through a series of rapids, heads under Ontario Highway 7, and reaches its mouth at the Moira River. The Moira River flows to the Bay of Quinte on Lake Ontario.

Recreation
The river is used by whitewater paddlers, particularly in spring as part of the M.A.C.K.fest (Marmora Area Canoe and Kayak Festival), with the community of Queensborough serving as a friendly access point recognized by Whitewater Ontario.

Tributaries
Railway Creek (right)
Queensborough Creek (left)
West Black River (right)
Canniff Creek (left)

See also
List of rivers of Ontario

References

Other map sources:

Rivers of Hastings County